Şükriye , meaning "grateful";, is a feminine given name. Notable people with the name include: 

Şükriye Dikmen ((1918–2000), Turkish painter
Şükriye Sultan (1906–1972), Ottoman princess
Şükriye Yılmaz (boen 2001=, Turkish armwrestler

Turkish feminine given names